Kuchary may refer to the following places in Poland:
Kuchary, Dzierżoniów County in Lower Silesian Voivodeship (south-west Poland)
Kuchary, Oława County in Lower Silesian Voivodeship (south-west Poland)
Kuchary, Kutno County in Łódź Voivodeship (central Poland)
Kuchary, Łęczyca County in Łódź Voivodeship (central Poland)
Kuchary, Radomsko County in Łódź Voivodeship (central Poland)
Kuchary, Lesser Poland Voivodeship (south Poland)
Kuchary, Gmina Stopnica in Świętokrzyskie Voivodeship (south-central Poland)
Kuchary, Gmina Wiślica in Świętokrzyskie Voivodeship (south-central Poland)
Kuchary, Masovian Voivodeship (east-central Poland)
Kuchary, Greater Poland Voivodeship (west-central Poland)
Kuchary, Silesian Voivodeship (south Poland)